Tomatlán (Nahuatl: "place of tomatoes") is a municipality in the Mexican state of Veracruz, located  south of the state capital of Xalapa.

Geography
It borders the municipalities of Ixhuatlán del Café to the northeast, Córdoba to the southeast, Chocamán to the southwest, and Coscomatepec de Bravo to the northwest.

Tomatlán is located in the Jamapa River basin. Agricultural land makes up 87.04% of the municipality's area.

Tomatlán's climate is humid and semi-warm with rain throughout the year.

History
In the 15th century a Teochichimeca settlement called Quechultenango ("wall of quetzals") was founded in the area, which in the colonial period became known as San Miguel Quechultenango Tomatlán.

On 18 January 1825 Tomatlán was incorporated as a municipality in the state of Veracruz. It became a free municipality on 15 January 1918.

Administration
The municipal government comprises a president, a councillor (Spanish: síndico), and a trustee (regidor). The current president of the municipality is Nicolas Prado Morales.

Demographics
In the 2010 Mexican Census, the municipality of Tomatlán recorded a population of 6763 inhabitants living in 1749 households. The 2015 Intercensal Survey estimated a population of 6869 inhabitants in Tomatlán.

There are 10 localities in the municipality, of which only the municipal seat, also called Tomatlán, is classified as urban. It recorded a population of 4348 inhabitants in the 2010 Census.

Economy
The most important economic activities in Tomatlán are sugarcane production and chicken farming, followed by coffee production and cattle farming.

References

Municipalities of Veracruz
1825 establishments in Mexico
States and territories established in 1825